Diggers is a 1931 Australian comedy film produced and directed by F. W. Thring starring popular stage comedian Pat Hanna. It was the first feature film from both men.

The movie is based on Hanna's stage show, and is concerned with the adventures of Australian soldiers during World War I.

Plot summary
Two Australian 'cobbers', Chic and Joe, attend a reunion 12 years after World War I and reminisce about their exploits together in France. They recall three incidents in particular. Firstly, the time they were in hospital and ingeniously feigned an illness to stay away from active service and the front line. Secondly, when the 'cobbers' attempt to steal rum from the British Army store. And finally, they recall relaxing in a French cafe while a fellow Digger romances the waitress (Eugenie Prescott).

Cast
Pat Hanna as Chic Williams
George Moon as Joe Mulga 
Joe Valli as McTavish
Norman French as medical officer
 Guy Hastings as Quarter-Master Sergeant
 Eugenie Prescott
Cecil Scott as Bluey
Edmund Warrington as Fatty
John Henry as a tommy
Rutland Becket as SM
Harry McClelland as Sergeant-Major Booth
Royce Milton as CO

NB: The George Moon above is George Moon Snr. Although well known in Australia during the 1920s for his dance partnership with Dan Morris (as Moon and Morris), he is now often confused with his son, British actor George Moon Jnr (father of actress Georgina Moon). For further details on George Moon Snr and Moon and Morris see Moon and Morris at Australian Variety Theatre Archive

Production
The movie was part of Efftee Film Productions' initial group of pictures, including A Co-respondent's Course and The Haunted Barn. The cost of making these and establishing the studio came to £80,000.

The script was adapted from Hanna's popular stage show. Eric Donaldson was the writer primarily responsible for adapting it to screen.

The film was shot in Thring's studio in His Majesty's Theatre, Melbourne. A cast of over 200 people was used.

According to Bert Nicholas, Arthur Higgins' assistant, Hanna and Thring often argued throughout the shoot. Hanna insisted that he was in nearly every shot of the film and insisted on the scenic model shots that Thring thought were unnecessary but which Hanna thought needed to tie everything together.

However Thring prevailed in a disagreement about the structure of the movie. The original stage show consisted of the same reunion dinner and three flashback episodes, but in a different structure – it started with the attempt to steal rum, then dealt with the waitress romance, and finished with the hospital sketch. The film was shot in the same order but Thring restructured it during editing. These changes annoyed Hanna, who decided to form his own production company to make his follow up films, Diggers in Blighty (1933) and Waltzing Matilda (1933).

Release
Diggers was released in Melbourne on a double bill with the short A Co-respondent's Course. Public response was at first poor but the film performed well in country areas. It was re-released in Melbourne on a double-bill with The Haunted Barn and was a success at the box office. Thring says that the movie earned £2,000 in one Melbourne theatre alone.

The movie was also released in England where it achieved 400 bookings, less successful than Thring's later His Royal Highness.

Thring's biographer Peter Fitzpatrick later wrote that:
Diggers is driven... by three things that made Hanna's concert parties a hit: the rapport between Chic, long and lean as the proverbial pull-through, and Joe, his little mate, as they battle authority in all its forms; George Moon's genius for physical comedy; and, above all, a delight in verbal gags built on the intrinsic slipperiness of language, especially as used by Chic and Joe.

See also
Cinema of Australia

References

Fitzpatrick, Peter, The Two Frank Thrings, Monash University 2012

External links

Diggers at Australian Screen Online
Diggers at National Film and Sound Archive
Diggers at Oz Movies
Diggers at Australian Variety Theatre Archive
Article on Digger-style theatre companies at Australian Variety Theatre Archive

1931 films
Australian World War I films
Films directed by F. W. Thring
Australian black-and-white films
Australian comedy films
1931 comedy films
1930s English-language films